Farzian Zainal is a politician from Christmas Island, who is a Councillor for the Shire of Christmas Island and Treasurer of the Indian Ocean Territories Regional Development Organisation.

Background 
Zainal was born on Christmas Island and speaks fluent Malay. Her grandfather was one of a number of Malaysian migrants who came to the island in the 1950s to work in the phosphate industry. She completed her education in Western Australia, like many other Christmas Islanders, since further education is not available on the island.

Career 
Zainal is a Councillor for the Shire of Christmas Island. She is due for re-election in 2023. She is a community representative for, and the Treasurer of, the Indian Ocean Territories Regional Development Organisation, which is administered by the Australian government. This includes responsibility for the Indian Ocean Territories Community Fund. She is a member of the management committee of Indian Ocean Group Training Association, which advocates for on island training and vocational education. During the COVID-19 pandemic, Zainal stated that it was concern for the elderly population that meant that younger islanders kept strictly to precautions to keep the island virus free.

References 

Australian women in politics
Living people
Government of Christmas Island
Year of birth missing (living people)